Ahmed Ammi (born 19 January 1981) is a Dutch-Moroccan footballer who plays as a right defender. He currently plays for Dutch amateur outfit SC Irene.

Club career
Ammi was born in Temsamane, Morocco, but moved to the Netherlands at a young age. He started playing football for local amateur side, SV Blerick, but was added to the youth department of VVV-Venlo, who at that time were known as VVV. He made his debut in the 2000–01 season, when VVV played in the Dutch second division.

Ammi made his next step in 2006, when he signed with NAC Breda. After playing only one season in Breda, he moved on to ADO Den Haag in 2008.

He moved to German Regionalliga West club KFC Uerdingen 05 in January 2014 and played for EVV, before joining fellow amateur side SC Irene in summer 2016.

References

1981 births
Living people
People from Oriental (Morocco)
Moroccan emigrants to the Netherlands
Association football fullbacks
Moroccan footballers
Dutch footballers
VVV-Venlo players
NAC Breda players
ADO Den Haag players
KFC Uerdingen 05 players
Eredivisie players
Eerste Divisie players
Moroccan expatriate footballers
Dutch expatriate footballers
Expatriate footballers in Germany
Dutch expatriate sportspeople in Germany
RKVV EVV players